Okpo is a neighborhood in the city of Geoje in South Gyeongsang Province, South Korea. The village is located on the eastern coast of Geoje Island and a center of the island.

Geoje in Korean means "great rescue", from the syllables "geo" (Korean: 거; Hanja: 巨) meaning great, and "je" (Korean: 제; Hanja: 濟) meaning rescue.

The Daewoo Shipbuilding & Marine Engineering (DSME) shipyard is located close to the town. A large portion of DSME employees live in Okpo, and DSME jackets are a common sight in the town at night.

There are very few standalone houses in Okpo and most residential accommodation is fulfilled by high-rise apartments. 
Rent is high. There are a number of local accommodation agencies offering apartments for rent to incoming foreigners, as well as other supporting services.

Okpo has a large foreign transient population due to the shipyards. As a result there is a 'Foreigner's Club' by the Admiral Hotel which is run by the local expat residents themselves. There are also over fifty Western bars and two dozen Western restaurants serving a variety of 'Western style' meals. There are also Indian, Pakistani, Vietnamese and Turkish restaurants, and local franchises such as 'Dunkin' Donuts', 'Quiznos', 'Baskin-Robbins' and 'Lotteria' (Japanese fast food burger chain).

From Busan airport, the journey time by taxi, by way of the Geoje-Busan Bridge (10,000KRW toll each way), is under 1 hour, although heavy weekend traffic can be up to 90 minutes.

There is an international school called the International School of Koje (ISK) -  which is a very convenient choice for foreign workers bringing their families to Okpo.

Okpo once had an amusement park, Okpo Land, on the outskirts of the city. It went out of business in 1999, but because the land has been zoned for environmentally low-impact projects, it remained abandoned until 2011, when it was finally demolished.

References

External links
Geoje City Official Website

Neighbourhoods in South Korea
Geoje